Rade Paprica (born 29 November 1956) is a Bosnian retired professional footballer who played in the former Yugoslavia, Greece and Turkey.

Club career
Born in Foča, SR Bosnia and Herzegovina, SFR Yugoslavia, Paprica started playing at local FK Sutjeska Foča. From 1977 to 1984 he played for local powerhouse Željezničar.

Paprica played for Greek side PAOK Thessaloniki from 1984 to 1986. He was one of the key players when PAOK FC won the Greek championship in 1985.

He also played for Beşiktaş for a year, Apollon Kalamarias the next year, and went to Cyprus to play for APOP Paphos for three years (1988–1991).

Post-playing career
After retiring from playing football in 1992, Paprica moved to Thessaloniki where he worked as a coach in PAOK's youth team.

References

External links
 
 EX YU Fudbalska Statistika po godinama

1956 births
Living people
People from Foča
Serbs of Bosnia and Herzegovina
Association football forwards
Yugoslav footballers
FK Sutjeska Foča players
FK Željezničar Sarajevo players
PAOK FC players
Beşiktaş J.K. footballers
Apollon Pontou FC players
APOP Paphos FC players
Yugoslav First League players
Süper Lig players
Super League Greece players
Cypriot First Division players
Yugoslav expatriate footballers
Expatriate footballers in Greece
Yugoslav expatriate sportspeople in Greece
Expatriate footballers in Turkey
Yugoslav expatriate sportspeople in Turkey
Expatriate footballers in Cyprus
Yugoslav expatriate sportspeople in Cyprus
PAOK FC non-playing staff